The Stacks Project is an open source collaborative mathematics textbook writing project with the aim to cover "algebraic stacks and the algebraic geometry needed to define them".  , the book consists of 115 chapters (excluding the license and index chapters) spreading over 7500 pages. The maintainer of the project, who reviews and accepts the changes, is Aise Johan de Jong.

See also
Kerodon a Stacks project inspired online textbook on categorical homotopy theory maintained by Jacob Lurie

References

External links
Project website

Latest from the Stacks Project (as of 2013) (Accessed 2020-04-01)

Mathematics textbooks